Timothy B. Brown is an American game designer, primarily of role-playing games. He has been a designer at Game Designers' Workshop, an editor at Challenge magazine, and the director of product development at TSR.

Career

GDW
Marc Miller, Frank Chadwick, Lester Smith, and Timothy Brown of GDW designed the new game Traveller: 2300 (1986) as an expansion of the original Traveller role-playing game. Brown also designed the Gamer's Choice Award-winning Star Cruiser board game. Brown served as editor of GDW's Challenge magazine.

TSR
Brown went to TSR in 1989, where he eventually became Director of Game Development. Brown was TSR's director of product development from 1991-1995, and oversaw the creation of their Ravenloft and Planescape game lines, among many other titles. Brown co-created the AD&D Dark Sun setting with Troy Denning and Mary Kirchoff. Brown and Denning led the project, alongside fiction editor Kirchoff, and they were soon joined by artist Brom, who contributed the unique illustrations that helped set Dark Sun apart from the other TSR settings, making Dark Sun the first of TSR's world designs with a more artistic sensibility. Brown and Denning also put together the 1991 D&D "black box" set, which became a top-seller for TSR, selling half a million copies in the next six years. Brown contributed to the design of Spellfire.

After TSR
Brown later went on to found Destination Games and work with Imperium Games. Destination Games produced Chaos Progenitus dice game (1996) and Pulp Dungeons: Uninvited Guests (1997) authored by Gary Gygax.

For Imperium's fourth edition of Traveller (also called Marc Miller's Traveller or T4) published in 1996, the designers worked on distinct parts of the rules, with Brown writing about aliens. Sweetpea Entertainment bought out the stock of the many creators who had worked on T4 and took over some of the day-to-day operations of the company; Brown took the helm of Imperium Games under Sweetpea's guidance, and was now the only official staff for Imperium, with others acting as freelancers. Brown, James Ward, Lester Smith, John Danovich, and Sean Everette founded the short-lived d20 company Fast Forward Entertainment (circa 2001-2005).

Brown also contributed to the designs of The Wheel of Time Collectible Card Game (1999) and the Dragon Ball Z Collectible Card Game (2000).

Bibliography 

Dark Knight of Karameikos (1995)
Dark Sun: Campaign Setting (Advanced Dungeons & Dragons, 2nd Edition) by Timothy B. Brown and Troy Denning (1991)
Dark Sun: Dragon Kings (2nd Edition) by Timothy B. Brown (1992)
Wondrous Items Of Power by Karen; Brown, Timothy; Ward, James M. Edited by Boomgaarden (2002)
2300 AD - Man's Battle For The Stars [BOX SET] by Marc Miller, Timothy B. Brown, Lester W. Smith, and Frank Chadwick (1988)
Official Price Guide to Role Playing Games by Timothy Brown and Tony Lee (1998)
Green Races by Timothy Brown and James A. Ward (2002)
Advanced Dungeons & Dragons : Dark Sun, The Wanderer's Journal by Troy Denning and Timothy B. Brown (1991)

Dungeons & Dragons novels
Dark Knight of Karameikos (1995)

Personal life
Brown is an accomplished guitar player and teacher.

References

External links

20th-century American male writers
20th-century American novelists
American fantasy writers
American male novelists
Dungeons & Dragons game designers
Living people
Place of birth missing (living people)
Year of birth missing (living people)